The 2nd Connecticut Regiment (1775) was authorized in the Connecticut State Troops and was organized from ten companies of volunteers from Hartford county in the state of Connecticut, United States, between 1–20 May 1775. It was adopted on 14 June 1775 into the Main Continental Army and assigned 22 July 1775 to Spencer's Brigade. The regiment was re-organized on 1 January 1776 to eight companies and re-designated as the 22nd Continental Regiment.

See also 
 22nd Continental Regiment
 Joseph Spencer
 Levi Wells
 Samuel Wyllys

References

Connecticut regiments of the Continental Army